Vincenzo Scaramuzza (also known as Vicente Scaramuzza; 1885–1968) was an Italian pianist and music teacher.

Biography
Scaramuzza was born in Crotone, Italy, on June 19, 1885. Introduced to the piano by his father, Francesco, a renowned piano teacher, he started performing at the age  of seven. After passing a difficult exam, he won a scholarship that allowed him to continue his studies in the prestigious Academy of Music of San Pietro a Maiella in Naples where he met the best teachers of the time, like Florestano Rossomandi, Alessandro Longo and Beniamino Cesi. He was still very young when he got his diploma with the congratulations of the jury and began his career as a concert pianist, performing in the biggest Italian towns.

But his great aspiration was teaching. At his time, it was very difficult to get a teaching post in any of the Italian Academies of Music. Scaramuzza had to take part in a very difficult National Competition, a real challenge for the best piano students of Italy. Among all the contestants, only Scaramuzza, and another student, Attilio Brugnoli, could get the highest marks. But, for some bureaucratic reasons and because he was older than Scaramuzza, it was Brugnoli who got the major teaching post in the Academy of Music of Parma, while Scaramuzza was awarded a consolation prize, a minor teaching post in Naples.

Disappointed and annoyed by the excessive bureaucratic rules of the Italian educational system that in his opinion hampered the freedom of expression of a teacher, after only two months teaching in Naples, Scaramuzza decided to leave Italy. It was the year 1907 when he moved to Argentina, where he really started his career as a teacher at the Santa Cecilia Academy of Music, in Buenos Aires. Then, after marrying one of his students, Sara Bagnati, he founded the "Scaramuzza Academy of Music" in 1912.

He also resumed his career as a concert pianist, performing not only in Argentina, but also in Europe. He soon became famous as a virtuoso of the piano. He was well known all over South and North America and Europe for the absolute confidence with which he was able to perform even the most challenging pieces of the repertoire thanks to his formidable technique that allowed him a complete mastery of the instrument.

But his pedagogical calling was stronger than his concert artist career. So in 1923 he gave his last concerts, notably a memorable one in Berlin where he played three Beethoven sonatas (op. 31 n°2, op. 106 and op. 110) under the applause of Ferruccio Busoni. From that moment on he dedicated himself exclusively to teaching, perfecting his extraordinary innovative method for piano teaching. This method, based on an accurate study of the anatomy of the pianist, allows a complete relaxation of the muscles and tendons of the hands and the arms even when the pianist performs the most difficult pieces of music. As a consequence, the sound is always smooth and round, never metallic, not even in the fortissimo, and the performer is never troubled by any muscular stiffening.

Hence, Scaramuzza devoted himself only to teaching from 1923 onwards. He taught many well-known international classical pianists such as Martha Argerich, Michèle Boegner, Bruno Leonardo Gelber, Carmen Piazzini, Daniel Levy, Mauricio Kagel, Fausto Zadra, Alberto Portugheis and Enrique Barenboim, father of Daniel Barenboim, not forgetting Maria Cristina Filoso, and Monica Stirpari who released in 2009 a CD of homage to her teacher. He also taught tango pianists Arminda Canteros, Osvaldo Pugliese, Horacio Salgán, Atilio Stampone, Orlando Goñi, Antonio de Raco and Sylvia Kersenbaum.

He was also a composer. Among his few compositions were Bosco Incantato, Hamlet, both chamber music works, and four Mazurkas composed for the piano.

He left no record of his teaching system as a book, but one of his students, Maria Rosa Oubiña de Castro, reconstructed it from material he wrote down in his lifetime. The resulting book is titled Enseñanzas de un gran maestro, and was published in 1973. Furthermore, four other relevant books have subsequently been published: L'arte pianistica di Vincenzo Scaramuzza by Prof. Antonio Lavoratore in 1987, Le Moi intime du Piano by Pierre Tran in 2009, Vincenzo Scaramuzza - Il Maestro dei grandi pianisti by Panzica Pamela Ivana Edmea in 2012 and Vicente Scaramuzza. La vigencia de una escuela pianística by Sebastian Colombo in 2013.

In the last years of his life, Scaramuzza was compelled to stay in bed by a serious sickness, but he never gave up teaching: he had the piano moved in his bedroom and from his bed he kept on giving lessons to his students until the end. He died in Buenos Aires on March 24, 1968.

References 

 

 "L'arte pianistica di Vincenzo Scaramuzza" by Prof. Antonio Lavoratore (Instituto Nazionale per lo Sviluppo Musicale del Mezzogiorno)
 "Le Moi intime du Piano" by Pierre Tran (Publisher: Van de Velde)

1885 births
1968 deaths
People from Crotone
Italian emigrants to Argentina
Italian classical pianists
Male classical pianists
Italian male pianists
Argentine classical pianists
Piano pedagogues
20th-century classical pianists
20th-century Italian male musicians